Sumit Ranjan Das (born 11 December 1955) is a US-based Indian high energy physicist and a professor at the University of Kentucky. Known for his research on string theory, Das is an elected fellow of the Indian Academy of Sciences. The Council of Scientific and Industrial Research, the apex agency of the Government of India for scientific research, awarded him the Shanti Swarup Bhatnagar Prize for Science and Technology, one of the highest Indian science awards, for his contributions to physical sciences in 1998.

Biography 

Born on 11 December 1955 at Kolkata in the Indian state of West Bengal, Sumit Ranjan Das did his early schooling at South Point School and earned his graduate degree from Presidency College and master's degree from the Science College, University of Calcutta. Moving to the US, he enrolled at the University of Chicago for his doctoral studies and after securing a PhD in 1983, he did his post-doctoral studies at Fermilab (1983–85) and California Institute of Technology (1985–87). On his return to India in 1987, he joined Tata Institute of Fundamental Research where he served as a member of faculty till 2001. Subsequently, he went back to the US and joined the Department of Physics and Astronomy, University of Kentucky College of Arts and Sciences where he holds the position of Jack and Linda Gill Professor. He was a senior associate at  Kavli Institute for the Physics and Mathematics of the Universe during 2009–10  and a Visiting Professor at Yukawa Institute for Theoretical Physics, Kyoto University during 2014 and has held visiting positions at several universities in the US.

Legacy 
The principal focus of Das' research is string theory and quantum field theory. His work on two dimensional strings is the earliest example of holographic principle. His work on black holes in string theory assisted in resolving the information paradox with regard to black holes.

Awards and honors 
Das was a gold medalist in both his graduate and master's examinations. The Council of Scientific and Industrial Research awarded him the Shanti Swarup Bhatnagar Prize, one of the highest Indian science awards in 1998. The Indian Academy of Sciences elected him as a fellow the same year.

Selected bibliography

See also 

 Black hole
 Hawking radiation

Notes

References

Further reading

External links 

Recipients of the Shanti Swarup Bhatnagar Award in Physical Science
Indian scientific authors
1955 births
Fellows of the Indian Academy of Sciences
University of Calcutta alumni
University of Chicago alumni
Fermilab
California Institute of Technology alumni
Academic staff of Tata Institute of Fundamental Research
University of Kentucky faculty
20th-century Indian physicists
Stanford University faculty
Princeton University faculty
Harvard University faculty
University of Chicago faculty
Rutgers University faculty
Living people
Scientists from Kolkata